is a Japanese global petroleum and metals conglomerate headquartered in Tokyo, Japan. In 2012 the multinational corporation consisted of 24,691 employees worldwide and, as of March 2013, JX Holdings was the forty-third largest company in the world by revenue. It is one of the core companies of the Mitsubishi Group through its predecessor (the original Nippon Oil Company)'s merger with Mitsubishi Oil.

Establishment
JXTG Holdings was established on April 1, 2010, through the joint share transfer by Nippon Oil Corporation and Nippon Mining Holdings, Inc. On July 1, 2010, all the businesses of both Group Companies were integrated and reorganized under JX Holdings, resulting in the incorporation of three core business companies:

 JXTG Nippon Oil & Energy - petroleum refining and marketing
 JX Nippon Oil & Gas Exploration - oil and natural gas exploration and production
 JX Nippon Mining & Metals - mining and metal

In April 2017, JX Holdings and TonenGeneral Sekiyu K.K. merged to form JXTG Holdings.  JXTG Holdings was renamed in June 2020 to ENEOS Holdings.

References 

Companies listed on the Tokyo Stock Exchange
Companies listed on the Nagoya Stock Exchange
Automotive companies based in Tokyo
Chemical companies based in Tokyo
Conglomerate companies based in Tokyo
Holding companies based in Tokyo
Manufacturing companies based in Tokyo
Oil companies based in Tokyo
Conglomerate companies established in 1888
Automotive fuel retailers
Mitsubishi companies
Japanese companies established in 1888
2017 mergers and acquisitions